Brazil competed at the 2022 World Athletics Championships in Eugene, United States, from July 15 to 24, 2022. The Brazilian Athletics Confederation entered 58 athletes.

On July 19, 2022, Alison dos Santos became the first Brazilian man to win a gold medal, with a Championship Record in men's 400 m hurdles.

With 1 gold and 1 bronze medals, Brazil finished 19th in the medal table and ranked 13th in the overall placing table with a total of 34 points.

Medalists

Team
On July 1, 2022, the Brazilian Athletics Confederation announced a team conformed by 52 athletes (33 men and 19 women). A week later, the Brazilian team was expanded to 58 athletes by adding 2 men and 4 women because of the points ranking quota.

Sprinters Gabriel Garcia and Lucas Rodrigues were included in the team for the men's 4 × 100 metres relay, but finally they had no participation. In the same way, Lucas Carvalho and Maria Victoria De Sena were part of the mixed 4 × 400 metres relay team, but had no participation.

Results
Brazil entered 58 athletes.

Men
Track events

* – Indicates the athlete competed in preliminaries but not the final.

Field events

Women
Track events

Field events

Mixed

References

World Championships in Athletics
2022
Nations at the 2022 World Athletics Championships